Pablo Marín Tejada (born 3 July 2003) is a Spanish professional footballer who plays as a midfielder for Real Sociedad B.

Club career
Born in Logroño, La Rioja, Marín joined Real Sociedad's youth setup in 2016, after representing EDF Logroño and Academia Tiki-Taka. He made his senior debut with the C-team on 1 November 2020, starting in a 1–3 Tercera División home loss against Tolosa CF.

Definitely promoted to the C-team ahead of the 2021–22 campaign, now in the Segunda División RFEF, Marín scored his first senior goal on 9 October 2021, netting his side's second in a 3–1 home success over UD Mutilvera. On 19 December, he scored a brace for the C's in a 3–2 win at Peña Sport FC.

Marín made his professional debut with the reserves on 8 January 2022, coming on as a late substitute for Luca Sangalli in a 1–1 away draw against CD Leganés in the Segunda División.

International career
In October 2021, Marín made his debut for the Spain under-19 national team.

Personal life
Marín's father Fernando was also a footballer and a midfielder. A CD Logroñés youth graduate, he featured in 21 La Liga matches and in over 200 appearances for the club overall.

References

External links

2003 births
Living people
Sportspeople from Logroño
Spanish footballers
Footballers from La Rioja (Spain)
Association football midfielders
La Liga players
Segunda División players
Primera Federación players
Segunda Federación players
Tercera División players
Real Sociedad C footballers
Real Sociedad B footballers
Real Sociedad footballers
Spain youth international footballers